DYBM (99.1 FM), broadcasting as Q Radio 99.1, is a radio station owned by Mareco Broadcasting Network and operated by Horizon of the Sun Communications. The station's studio and transmitter are located along Cordova Ave., Brgy. Mandalangan, Bacolod.

The station was established in 1998 as 99.1 Crossover with a smooth jazz format. On November 16, 2020, the station, along with other MBNI provincial stations, started carrying the Q Radio brand and switched to a CHR/Top 40 format. Prior to the reformat, Horizon of the Sun Communications (producers of Chinatown TV) took over the operations of the Manila flagship station at the end of 2019.

References

Radio stations in Bacolod
Radio stations established in 1998